Jordan Matthew Barrett (born 17 February 1997) is a New Zealand rugby union player who currently plays as a utility back internationally for New Zealand's All Blacks, and for the Hurricanes in the Super Rugby competition. Having previously been an apprentice for the All Black squad in 2016, Barrett was first selected for New Zealand in 2017, making his debut against Samoa in a warm-up test prior to the British & Irish Lions series.

Barrett has previously represented New Zealand at age-grade level, being a part of the 2016 under-20 side that took part at the World Championships in England. He also represents Taranaki at provincial level, previously playing for Canterbury during their 2016 Ranfurly Shield tenure, as they became Mitre 10 Cup champions.

He was the winner of the Duane Monkley Medal for the Mitre 10 Cup Player of the Year in 2016, and was also New Zealand's age-grade player of the year that year. He was named over Taranaki Sportsperson of the Year at the Taranaki Sports Awards in 2017.

Early life 
Born and raised in a rugby household, his older brothers Beauden, Scott and Kane also went on to become professional rugby players. His father Kevin 'Smiley' Barrett was an uncompromising loose forward for Taranaki, playing 167 games for the amber and blacks. Jordie played in the Canterbury Metro senior rugby tournament for Lincoln University. He also represented his school, Francis Douglas Memorial College just like his brothers before him.

Barrett was a member of the New Zealand Under 20 team which participated in the 2016 World Rugby Under 20 Championship in England where he made 3 appearances in total scoring 52 points including one try. He played for the New Zealand under-20 side in May 2016 in the Oceania Championship on the Gold Coast against Australia.

Rugby career

2016–17 
Barrett signed with Canterbury for their 2016 Mitre 10 Cup campaign. He made his debut coming off the bench, but found himself making the starting match-day 23 throughout the year. Barrett began to impress, following up a solid showing against Tasman in just his second game at provincial level. A 25-point haul was his reward for a quality performance. Overall Barrett gained 12 appearances for the side and scored 123 points, as well as winning the side's eighth Mitre 10 Cup title after their 43–27 victory over the Tasman in the 2016 grand final and also retaining the Ranfurly Shield. After his stand-out year, he featured at the New Zealand Rugby Awards, winning the age grade and Mitre 10 Cup player of the year.

In September 2016, Barrett signed a two-year deal with the Hurricanes in Super Rugby. He made his debut starting at fullback against the Sunwolves. Barrett became a regular starter following the injury of teammate Nehe Milner-Skudder, which saw him produce one of rugby's great burglaries after he scored the Hurricanes second try in their Super Rugby clash against the Stormers. A grubber-kick into the Stormers goal area, saw Nizaam Carr getting to the ball first, as Barrett challenged him and planted it down, just inside the dead ball line. After being selected for New Zealand and continuing his form for the Hurricanes, Barrett was released to play against the British & Irish Lions midweek match. Featuring at fullback, Barrett was a part of a draw against the touring team. He ended with a try assist after a pass to Ngani Laumape to score and kicked nine points. Barrett has gone on the record stating that he prefers Tasty cheese to Edam cheese.

In October 2016, he was included in the All Blacks side for the 2016 Autumn Internationals as an apprentice. Whilst an apprentice in the New Zealand national team during their northern hemisphere tour, Barrett signed with Taranaki for 2017.

In June 2017, Barrett was one of three uncapped backs named in the All Blacks' 33-man squad for the Pasifika Challenge against Samoa and the three-test series against the touring British & Irish Lions 2017 team, along with brothers Beauden and Scott. In what was brother Beauden's 50th test, Barrett made his international debut in the 78–0 against Samoa on 16 June 2017, replacing All Blacks captain Ben Smith in the 63rd minute. Barrett was one of two debutants that day, with Hurricanes team-mate Vaea Fifita replacing veteran loose forward Jerome Kaino off the bench. Barrett played well and helped set up Hurricanes team-mate Ardie Savea for his second try. After Blues winger Rieko Ioane fell ill and with injuries to Ben Smith and winger Waisake Naholo, Barrett started at fullback in the third test against the Lions and scored his first international try in the first half following a pass from Anton Lienert-Brown. Barrett also set up Hurricanes teammate Ngani Laumape for the opening try. Barrett played the full 80 minutes but was pushed into touch after the final whistle while attempting to score a double, with the final score, 15-15, saw a drawn series between the Lions and All Blacks.

Barrett was initially named in the 2017 Rugby Championship squad for but was ruled out for the rest of the year after requiring shoulder surgery. Barrett was replaced in the squad by then-uncapped Crusaders utility back, David Havili, almost immediately.

2018–19 
After a good 2018 Super Rugby season, as well as another knee injury to Israel Dagg, Barrett was re-called by All Blacks Head Coach, Steve Hansen, in New Zealand's 33-man squad for the 2018 June series, a three-test series against France. He started alongside both of his older brothers, Scott and Beauden, in the first test of the series, making the Barrett brothers the first trio of siblings to ever be named in an international rugby team's starting lineup. Barrett was replaced in the test by Damian McKenzie, after 60 minutes, with the All Blacks winning against France, 52–11.

Barrett won Man of the Match in the second test against France, which took place on 16 June, at Barrett's homeground, Westpac Stadium. He scored the second and third two tries of his international career and played the full 80 minutes of the test, which was a 26–13 win, claiming the series for the All Blacks. Although Barrett performed well in the first and second tests of the series, he was benched for the third, with Waisake Naholo's ball-running preferred by the selectors. Barrett went on to replace Sonny Bill Williams in the third test's 57th minute, with winger Rieko Ioane, moving into outside centre, while All Blacks Vice-Captain, Ben Smith moved to the wing for Barrett at fullback. The third test was a 49–14 win, where Scott Barrett followed in Jordie's lead, winning Man of the Match.

The 2018 Rugby Championship saw Barrett miss the first Bledisloe Cup test against Australia's Wallabies, before he re-joined his two brothers in the All Blacks, for the second test against the Wallabies, on 25 August. With Rieko Ioane out injured, Barrett once again started at fullback, with Ben Smith and Waisake Naholo starting on the wings. Barrett's brother Beauden joined Jordie and Scott as a Man of the Match-winner during the 2018 season, scoring four tries in their 40–12 win over the Wallabies, which saw a 67-minute performance from Jordie, before he was replaced by Damian McKenzie.

Barrett missed another test in the Rugby Championship, with his Hurricanes team-mate, Nehe Milner-Skudder, earning a re-call for New Zealand after a long period of time being injured. He was then bought back into the starting lineup, at fullback, for the first test against South Africa at Westpac Stadium, on 15 September 2018. Barrett scored the opening try of the test, only 4 minutes in, but the test quickly went into South Africa's favour. Barrett, as well as his brother Beauden, both performed poorly in the test. Barrett notably let in Aphiwe Dyantyi for South Africa's first try, then throwing a pass to Willie le Roux, for South Africa's second try, only five minutes after Dyantyi's opening try. Barrett was replaced by Damian McKenzie, who also performed poorly, in the 58th minute. The All Blacks suffered a shock 34–36 loss to South Africa and Barrett did not play again during the Rugby Championship.

On the 2018 end-of-year tour, Barrett played in two tests. His first was a poor performance against Japan, which the All Blacks won with a 69-31 margin. For the final test of the 2018 season, against Italy, Barrett was unusually given a start on the right wing, with Waisake Naholo on the left wing and Rieko Ioane being used off the bench. Although he played on the wing, Barrett was the best-performing player on the field against Italy and won his second Man of the Match award for 2018, scoring four tries in the test, becoming only the third All Black of the decade to score four tries in a match, after his brother Beauden, and former All Black, Zac Guildford.

Statistics 

Updated: 6 September 2021
Source: Jordan M Barrett Rugby History

List of international test tries

References

External links 
 All Blacks U20

1997 births
New Zealand international rugby union players
Canterbury rugby union players
Rugby union fullbacks
Rugby union centres
Lincoln University (New Zealand) alumni
Rugby union players from New Plymouth
Living people
Jordie
People educated at Francis Douglas Memorial College
Rugby union wings
Rugby union fly-halves
New Zealand rugby union players
Hurricanes (rugby union) players
Taranaki rugby union players